is a railway station on the high-speed Sanyo Shinkansen line in Onomichi, Hiroshima, Japan, operated by West Japan Railway Company (JR West).

Lines

History
The station opened on 13 March 1988.

References

External links

 JR West station information 

Railway stations in Hiroshima Prefecture
Sanyō Shinkansen
Railway stations in Japan opened in 1988